The 2022 United States Senate election in New Hampshire was held on November 8, 2022, to elect a member of the United States Senate to represent the State of New Hampshire. The primary elections were held on September 13, 2022.

Incumbent first-term Democratic U.S. senator Maggie Hassan was reelected, defeating Republican retired brigadier general Don Bolduc by an unexpectedly large margin that surpassed most polls.

This election marked the first time a Democrat won re-election to New Hampshire's Class 3 Senate seat.

Democratic primary

Candidates

Nominee 
 Maggie Hassan, incumbent U.S. Senator

Eliminated in primary 
 Paul Krautman, dentist and candidate for U.S. Senate in 2020
 John Riggieri

Endorsements

Results

Republican primary

Candidates

Nominee 
Don Bolduc, retired U.S. Army Special Forces brigadier general and candidate for U.S. Senate in 2020

Eliminated in primary 
Gerard Beloin, roofing contractor and perennial candidate
John Berman, electronic hardware designer, test engineer, and candidate for U.S. Senate (Kansas and Minnesota) in 2020
Bruce Fenton, bitcoin advocate, financial analyst and entrepreneur
 Dennis Lamare 
 Edmund LaPlante, U.S. Marine Corps veteran
 Vikram Mansharamani, author and businessman
Chuck Morse, President of the New Hampshire Senate and former acting Governor of New Hampshire
Tejasinha Sivalingam, landlord and candidate for state representative in 2018 and 2020
Kevin Smith, former Londonderry town manager and candidate for Governor of New Hampshire in 2012

Declined
 Chris Sununu, Governor of New Hampshire (ran for reelection)
 Kelly Ayotte, former U.S. Senator

Endorsements

Debates

Polling

Results

Libertarian convention

Candidates

Nominee 
Jeremy Kauffman, founder and CEO of LBRY, board member of the Free State Project

Eliminated at convention 
Kevin Kahn

Independents

Candidates 
Tejasinha Sivalingam, (write-in)

Did not qualify 
Geoff Woollacott, businessman
Steve Hattamer, physician

General election

Predictions

Endorsements

Polling
Aggregate polls

Maggie Hassan vs. Kelly Ayotte

Maggie Hassan vs. Bruce Fenton

Maggie Hassan vs. Chuck Morse
Aggregate polls

Maggie Hassan vs. Corey Lewandowski

Maggie Hassan vs. Corky Messner

Maggie Hassan vs. Kevin Smith

Maggie Hassan vs. Chris Sununu

Generic Democrat vs. generic Republican

on if Maggie Hassan should be re-elected

Debates

Results

In the early months of the campaign, Hassan maintained a healthy lead in the polls. Polls began to tighten around September 2022 and by late October, a few polls even showed Bolduc with a narrow lead or had the candidates tied. Most pundits concurred that Hassan had a very slight edge and that the race would be extremely tight. However, Hassan won reelection by 9 points, a margin considerably wider than what was expected and one far greater than her 0.14 point plurality in 2016. Hassan's victory made her the first Democrat to win re-election to the Class 3 senate seat in New Hampshire history. This, along with Democrats' comfortable victories in New Hampshire's two House races, affirmed New Hampshire's transition from a closely contested swing state to a clearly Democratic leaning state at the federal level.

}

Results by county

See also 
 2022 United States Senate elections
 2022 New Hampshire elections

Notes 

Partisan clients

References

External links 
Official campaign websites
 Don Bolduc (R) for Senate
 Maggie Hassan (D) for Senate
 Jeremy Kauffman (L) for Senate
 Geoff Woollacott (I) for Senate

2022
New Hampshire
United States Senate